John Collins (born 23 May 1944) is an Irish barrister called to the Bar in 1967. He was called to the English Bar in the Middle Temple in 1972. He was called to the Bar of New South Wales, Sydney in 1989. he has participated in prominent criminal court cases, primarily in England. He founded Westgate Chambers in Lewes, Sussex in 1987. From there approximately 50 Barristers serve all of South East England.

Personal life

He grew up in Killiney, Co. Dublin. He attended Presentation College, Glasthule, Cistercian College, Roscrea and Redemptorist College, Limerick. 
Whilst studying law at the King's Inns, Dublin, he was elected Auditor of the Law Students Debating Society. His Inaugural coincided with the 50th. Anniversary of the Easter Rising and was attended by a very distinguished audience. He delivered his Inaugural address "Retrospect 66" in front of the then President, Éamon de Valera, who was involved in that Rising. Also present was the British Ambassador, Sir Geoffrey Tory,  Cardinal Conway, The Irish Chief Justice,(who later became President) Cearbhaill O Dalaigh, Seán Lemass, the Taoiseach and an array of Judges, Politicians and Lawyers.
Before settling down to practising law he founded Squash Ireland. This was the first commercial Squash venture in Ireland. Before he sold it to a consortium headed by Paddy McGrath, he had built 5 Courts in Rathgar, 6 in Dalkey and 8 in Clontarf. When he sold in 1975, he brought his wife and children to live in Pinner, Middlesex. This coincided with the deteriorating  security situation in Ireland.
He was married twice, to his first wife for 28 years and then to his second wife for 4 years. He has 5 children, Patrick (PJ), Aisling, Paul, Glenn and Maria Collins

Famous cases
In Ireland he was leading counsel in the much disputed attempt to rezone the Harold's Cross Greyhound track in 1971. In 1972 he argued, unsuccessfully, for the registration of the word "poteen".
In England he participated in many leading criminal trials. The most famous was the £25 million gold Brink's-Mat robbery from Heathrow Airport in 1983. He represented the first named handler of the proceeds, Brian Perry.(Times) He was one of the counsel in the Case that set down the guidelines for sentencing in Rape Cases . (Criminal appeal Reports)

References

External links
 DeBretts

Irish barristers
1944 births
Living people
Alumni of King's Inns
People educated at Cistercian College, Roscrea